Mohamed Oubahim (born 1 January 1959) is a Moroccan cross-country skier. He competed in the men's 10 kilometre classical event at the 1992 Winter Olympics.

References

1959 births
Living people
Moroccan male cross-country skiers
Olympic cross-country skiers of Morocco
Cross-country skiers at the 1992 Winter Olympics
Place of birth missing (living people)
20th-century Moroccan people